Supernova II (or SuperNova II) is a computer moderated, play-by-mail (PBM) game of space conflict.

History and development
Supernova II was a play-by-mail game of space conflict designed by Peter Donnan and Russel Norris and published by Rolling Thunder Games. Flagship editor Tim Sullivan called it a "sophisticated space opera". It was released in the U.S. and UK in February and August 1989, respectively. It improved on their initial offering of Supernova. Supernova II was computer moderated, an update from Supernova's hand-moderation. By 2004, Rolling Thunder Games released Supernova III.

Gameplay
Players custom designed ships for assignment in fleets which could take offensive or defensive actions. Twelve ship types were available. These included: Colonial Transports, Destroyers, Escort Carriers, Explorers, Fast Freighters, Fleet Scouts, Frigates, Heavy Freighters, Heavy Troop Transports, Light Cruisers, Star Destroyers, and Troop Transports. Players selected a race to play as well, a consequential choice for gameplay.

According to Wayne Mohan, "SuperNova is the Commando unit, a small, elite band of your finest" which can explore or accomplish other tasks. Intrigue and diplomacy were elements of gameplay. Both combat between ships and ground combat were possible.

Gameplay in Supernova II was challenging and careful play in the first eight months was critical to success. The editors of Flagship stated that it was "one of the hardest games to play well from turn 1". Rick McFarland put its complexity just below games like Empyrean Challenge.

Reception
A reviewer in the September–October 1987 issue of Paper Mayhem highly recommended Supernova II, stating it was "an improvement over the original in almost every area". He noted that combat played a greater role and gameplay was challenging. As of November 1989, Supernova II was the highest rated game of 53 listed PBM games in Paper Mayhem. In the November–December 1989 issue of Paper Mayhem, Supernova II took 1st place in the Best PBM Game of 1989 list. The game also took 1st place in the magazine's Best PBM Game of 1989 list.

See also
 List of play-by-mail games

Notes

References

Bibliography

Further reading

 
 
 
 

Science fiction games
Multiplayer games
Play-by-mail games
Wargames